Francis John Stephens Hopwood, 1st Baron Southborough,  (2 December 1860 – 17 January 1947) was a British civil servant and solicitor.

Biography 
Hopwood was born in Bayswater, London, the son of a barrister. He was educated at King Edward VI School, Louth, Lincolnshire, of which his uncle was headmaster, and was admitted solicitor in 1882. In 1885 he became an assistant law clerk to the Board of Trade, and was appointed Assistant Solicitor to the Board in 1888 and private secretary to the President of the Board of Trade in 1892. In 1893 he became Secretary to the Railway Department and in 1901 Permanent Secretary to the Board of Trade. In 1906 he went to South Africa as a member of the committee to determine the constitutions of the Transvaal and the Orange River Colony.

In 1907 he was appointed Permanent Under-Secretary of State for the Colonies and in 1910 vice-chairman of the Development Commission. In 1912 he was appointed to the Privy Council and appointed Additional Civil Lord of the Admiralty. In 1917 he was elected secretary to the Irish Convention, set up to explore solutions to the Irish Home Rule question. In 1919 he chaired the Franchise Committee looking into the suffrage in India. Thereafter he entered business, taking a number of directorships.

Hopwood was appointed Companion of the Order of St Michael and St George (CMG) in 1893, Companion of the Order of the Bath (CB) in 1895, Knight Commander of the Order of the Bath (KCB) in November 1901, Knight Commander of the Order of St Michael and St George (KCMG) in 1906, Knight Grand Cross of the Order of St Michael and St George (GCMG) in 1908, Knight Grand Cross of the Order of the Bath (GCB) in 1916, Knight Grand Cross of the Royal Victorian Order (GCVO) in 1917, and Knight Commander of the Order of the Star of India (KCSI) in the 1920 New Year Honours. On 1 November 1917 he was created Baron Southborough, of Southborough in the County of Kent.

Hopwood was appointed Registrar of the Order of Saint Michael and Saint George in 1907, and Secretary of the Order in 1909.

The lifeboat RNLB Lord Southborough (Civil Service No. 1) (ON 688) was named after him.

Footnotes

References
Biography, Oxford Dictionary of National Biography

External links 

 

1860 births
1947 deaths
People from Paddington
English solicitors
Members of HM Government Legal Service
Hopwood, Francis
Hopwood, Francis
Lords of the Admiralty
Barons in the Peerage of the United Kingdom
Knights Grand Cross of the Order of the Bath
Knights Grand Cross of the Order of St Michael and St George
Knights Grand Cross of the Royal Victorian Order
Knights Commander of the Order of the Star of India
Members of the Privy Council of the United Kingdom
People educated at King Edward VI Grammar School, Louth
Barons created by George V